Peter Bixby is a New Hampshire politician.

Education
Bixby graduated from Attleboro High School. Bixby earned a B.A. from Yale University in 1984 and a Ph.D. in comparative literature from Indiana University Bloomington in 1999.

Political career
On November 6, 2012, Bixby was elected to the New Hampshire House of Representatives where he represents the Strafford 17 district. Bixby assumed office on December 5, 2012. Bixby is a Democrat.

Personal life
Bixby resides in Dover, New Hampshire. Bixby is married and has two children.

References

Living people
People from Dover, New Hampshire
Yale University alumni
Indiana University Bloomington alumni
Democratic Party members of the New Hampshire House of Representatives
21st-century American politicians
Year of birth missing (living people)